Cobblestones are small stones used in paving streets.

Cobblestone may also refer to:

 Cobble (geology), a class of rock fragment larger than a pebble and smaller than a boulder
 Cobblestone (magazine), a children's magazine
 A unit of credit in the BOINC Credit System of the BOINC platform for volunteer computing
 The Pebbles of Etratat, 1972 film also known as Cobblestones
 Cobblestone Records, a jazz record label during the 1970s
 Cobblestone Jazz, an electronic music band

See also
 Cobble (disambiguation)